= Shanghai Interpretation Accreditation =

Shanghai Interpretation Accreditation (Chinese: 上海外语口译证书考试) is a test aiming at selecting intellectuals skilled on interpretation in the People's Republic of China. The test was organised by Pudong Continuing Education Center of Shanghai Higher Education (PCEC) and is held twice a year, in March and December respectively. Initially launched in June, 1995, there had been a total of 198,200 participants by the autumn of 2004.
